DeWitt Thompson Weaver Jr. (September 14, 1939 – March 18, 2021) was an American golf consultant and professional golfer who played on the PGA Tour and the Senior PGA Tour.

Early life 
Weaver was born in Danville, Kentucky. He spent part of his youth there and in Lubbock, Texas, where his father was the head football coach at Texas Tech in the 1950s. In high school, he excelled in a number of sports.

Amateur career 
After graduation, he enrolled at Southern Methodist University, where he was a multisport letterman. Weaver moved to Georgia after college and became a dominant player in Georgia amateur golf.

Professional career 
Weaver turned professional in 1964. Weaver competed on the PGA Tour from 1967 to 1976, winning twice in the early 1970s. His best year as a professional golfer was 1971 when he finished in the top-25 on the PGA Tour money list. In 1980 and 1981, he was the Georgia PGA Player of the year.

After reaching the age of 50 in September 1989, Weaver began competing on the Senior PGA Tour. His lone win in this venue came in 1991 at the Bank One Senior Classic. Rallying from five shots down on the final day, he defeated J. C. Snead in a playoff with a birdie on the second hole.

After retiring as a touring professional, Weaver held club pro positions at Sea Palms, Sky Valley and Innsbruck golf clubs. He ran a golf consulting company, DeWitt Weaver Golf Solutions LLC, with his children. Weaver lived in Braselton, Georgia, with wife, Sheri. He was a spiritual man of strong Christian faith; he started junior golf programs at St. Simons Island and Rabun County High Schools at opposite ends of the state of Georgia. He was inducted into the Georgia Golf Hall of Fame in 1998, the Georgia Sports Hall of Fame in 2003, and the Northeast Georgia Sports Hall of Fame in 2004.

Personal life 
Weaver died at his home in Marietta, Georgia, on March 18, 2021.

Professional wins (30)

PGA Tour wins (2)

PGA Tour playoff record (1–0)

Other wins (18)
1964 Louisiana Open
1966 Georgia PGA Championship, Dixie PGA
1969 Atlanta Open
1970 Georgia PGA Championship
1971 Atlanta Open, Georgia PGA Championship, Dalton Invitational
1972 Georgia Open
1973 Georgia Open
1974 Georgia PGA Championship
1977 Georgia Open
1978 Georgia PGA Championship
1979 Georgia Open, Georgia PGA Championship, Georgia Match Play Championship
1984 Georgia PGA Championship
1988 Houston Lake Invitational

Senior PGA Tour wins (1)

Senior PGA Tour playoff record (1–0)

Other senior career wins (9)
2004 Landings Senior Classic
2005 Doublegate Senior Classic
2006 Dalton Beverage Senior Classic
2008 Waycross Senior Classic
2009 Dan Parish Senior Classic
2010 Georgia PGA Seniors, Georgia Section Senior Junior 
2011 Hard Labor Creek Senior Classic
2014 Weaver Cup

See also
1966 PGA Tour Qualifying School graduates

References

External links

American male golfers
PGA Tour golfers
PGA Tour Champions golfers
Golfers from Kentucky
Golfers from Texas
Golfers from Georgia (U.S. state)
People from Danville, Kentucky
Sportspeople from Lubbock, Texas
Sportspeople from Marietta, Georgia
1939 births
2021 deaths